Kwok Tak-seng OBE (12 March 1911 – 30 October 1990) was a Hong Kong businessman. He was the founder of Sun Hung Kai Properties, one of the major property developers in Hong Kong.

Early life
Kwok was born in Macau. The ancestral home of the Kwok family was located in Zhongshan, Guangdong, formerly known as Xiangshan. He emigrated to Hong Kong after World War II.

Career 
Kwok partnered with Fung King-hey and Lee Shau-kee to establish Sun Hung Kai Enterprises, a predecessor of Sun Hung Kai Properties in 1963. Sun Hung Kai Properties was publicly listed in Hong Kong in 1972 and soon became one of the top companies listed on the Stock Exchange of Hong Kong by market capitalisation.

Kwok was appointed OBE in the 1986 Birthday Honours.

Kwok also served as a non-executive director of fellow developer New World Development.

Personal life 
Kwok married Kwong Siu-hing. They have three sons, Walter Kwok, 
Thomas Kwok, and Raymond Kwok.

On 30 October 1990, Kwok died of a heart attack. Kwok was 79.

Kwok was succeeded as chairman of Sun Hung Kai by his eldest son, Walter. In 2008, after a very public intra-family tussle, his wife Kwong Siu-hing became chairman.

References

1911 births
1990 deaths
Hong Kong billionaires
Hong Kong real estate businesspeople
 
New World Development people
Officers of the Order of the British Empire